Tappeh Azimeh (also romanized as Tappeh ‘Az̧īmeh and Tappeh-ye ‘Az̧īmeh) is a village in Qaleh Shahin Rural District, in the Central District of Sarpol-e Zahab County, Kermanshah Province, Iran. At the 2006 census, its population was 152, divided into 33 families.

References 

Populated places in Sarpol-e Zahab County